Golgun may refer to:
 Golgun, Isfahan